The AMSOIL Racer, also known as the Rutan Biplane Racer and the Rutan Model 68 Racer, was a race tandem wing plane which was designed by Burt Rutan's Rutan Aircraft Factory, and built and flown by Dan Mortensen. It set several speed records, but crashed at the 1983 Reno Air Races.

Conception and construction
The concept which led to the AMSOIL Racer began in 1979 when race pilot Dan Mortensen approached Burt Rutan about designing an aircraft that would beat the Beck-Mahoney Sorceress, owned by Don Beck and which was dominating the competition at the time. After some research and calculations, Rutan produced three preliminary designs, and the least radical of these was chosen. Like the Model 54 Quickie tandem wing that he had previously designed, the Model 68 (as Rutan designated it) was configured with a canard wing, a main wing and, unlike the Quickie, had additional horizontal flight surface in the form of a T-tail. Rutan sold rights and plans to build two aircraft of the design to Mortensen for $6,000.

The construction began in January, 1981, in Sacramento, California, first in a garage and then in a hangar. During the construction phase, Amsoil signed on as a sponsor, in order to promote its new synthetic aviation motor oils. The plane was built from fiberglass, kevlar and graphite composites. First flight took place that summer, but the aircraft was damaged by heat from the engine's exhaust. After it was rebuilt, it was entered in the 1981 Reno Air Races.

Racing and records
At the 1981 Reno Air Races, the AMSOIL Racer, with Mortensen as pilot, finished third, after being assessed a penalty for cutting home pylon (due to the need to avoid a collision with the racer Sundancer). Due to roll control problems, Mortensen took the plane to Rutan's home base at the Mojave Airport for further design analysis  and flight testing by Rutan Aircraft Factory pilots Mike Melvill and Dick Rutan. The aileron control system design was subsequently modified.

Mortesen then set out to break speed records.

The plane was completely destroyed, but since Rutan had designed the cockpit to withstand a 22g impact, Mortensen survived with only minor injuries. 

The aircraft was rebuilt for static display, and was suspended over the Pylon Bar in the Reno Hilton (now the Grand Sierra Resort) in Reno, Nevada, for many years. It now resides in the EAA Museum at Oshkosh, WI. The second aircraft that was licensed by Rutan was never built.

Specifications

References
Discussion of the aircraft and crash
Aerofiles info

Racing aircraft
Homebuilt aircraft
1980s United States sport aircraft
Tandem-wing aircraft
Aircraft first flown in 1981